Dolor may refer to:

 Pain
 Suffering
 The unit of measurement in utilitarianism, see Felicific calculus#Hedons and dolors
 Dolor (sculpture), a work by Clemente Islas Allende in Mexico City

See also
 Dolors, a given name